

M

N

O

P

Q

R

S 

 
 

(traditionally pronounced "shiv")

T

U

V

W

X

Y

Z

See also

 Articles that link to this glossary

Notes

References

Sources

 (1848 edition)

 
 

 

Nautical

Shipbuilding
Water transport
Wikipedia glossaries using description lists